White Devil Armory is the 17th studio album by the American thrash metal band Overkill. It was released on July 18, 2014 in Europe through Nuclear Blast and July 22 in North America through eOne Music.

Reception and sales

White Devil Armory has received mostly positive reviews. AllMusic's Gregory Heaney awarded White Devil Armory three-and-a-half stars out of five, and called it "a monument to classic thrash that makes it clear the band's recent form is far from a fluke." He also stated that "the album finds the band once again going from strength to strength, pursuing their muse with a relentless vigor that imbues their sound with a refreshing directness."

Reviewing the album for Get Your Rock Out, Michael Dodd cited the bass work of Verni as one of the record's strengths. He argued that Verni imbued the song "Bitter Pill" with "a heaviness that is almost industrial", and concluded that while the whole album is a "thrash juggernaut", it is the exploits of the bassist that make certain songs stand out.

George Nisbet writing for All About The Rock said "If they can continue to release records of this calibre, then we've got some great music to look forward to. If you like quality thrash, you will absolutely love this!!".

White Devil Armory was Overkill's most successful album; it peaked at number 31 on the Billboard 200, making it Overkill's highest chart position in their career and it sold 8,600 copies in its first week in the U.S. In its second week, the album sold over 2,850 copies in the U.S., bringing the sales to over 11,000 copies and dropping to number 99 on the Billboard 200. On the third week, the album dropped to number 158 on the Billboard 200 and sold 1,850 copies, totalling over 13,000 copies sold in its first 3 weeks. It won a 2014 Metal Storm Award for Best Thrash Metal Album.

Track listing

Credits
Writing, performance and production credits are adapted from the album liner notes.

Personnel
Overkill
 Bobby Ellsworth – lead vocals
 D. D. Verni – bass, backing vocals
 Dave Linsk – lead guitar
 Derek "The Skull" Tailer – rhythm guitar
 Ron Lipnicki – drums

Additional musicians
 Mark Tornillo - backing vocals on "Miss Misery"

Production
 Overkill – production
 Greg Reely – mixing, mastering
 D.D. Verni, Dave Linsk – engineering
 Dan Korneff – editing
 Dave Linsk – recording (at SKH Recording Studios)
 Jon Ciorciari – recording (at JRod Productions)
 Jon D'Uva – additional recording
 Rob Shallcross – additional editing

Artwork and design
 Travis Smith – cover art, layout
 Hakon Grav, Nico Ramos – photography
 Mike Romeo – orchestrations

Studios
 Gear Recording Studio, Shrewsbury, New Jersey – recording
 SKH Studios, Stuart, Florida – additional recording
 JRod Productions, Pomona, New York – additional recording

Charts

References

External links
 
  White Devil Armory at Nuclear Blast

Overkill (band) albums
2014 albums
Nuclear Blast albums